In artificial intelligence, operations research, and related fields, a linguistic value (for some authors linguistic variable) is a natural language term which is derived using quantitative or qualitative reasoning such as with probability and statistics or fuzzy sets and systems.

Example of linguistic value

For example, if a shuttle heat shield is deemed of having a linguistic value of a "very low" percentage of damage in re-entry, based upon knowledge from experts in the field, that probability would be given a value of say, 5%.  From there on out, if it were to be used in an equation, the variable of percentage of damage will be at 5% if it deemed very low percentage.

References

Knowledge representation